Mount King Edward is a mountain located at the head of the Athabasca River valley in Jasper National Park, Canada. Mt. King Edward is situated on the Continental Divide with Mt. Columbia 5 km (3.4 mi) east. The mountain was named in 1906 by Mary Schäffer Warren after King Edward VII.

Mt. King Edward should not be confused with King Edward Peak, just north of the US border, although it too was named after King Edward.

The mountain was first climbed in 1924 by J. W. A. Hickson, Howard Palmer, guided by Conrad Kain A. Carpe and H. Palmer made an attempt on the West face in 1920 but only managed to reached .

References

External links

Canadian Rockies
Mountains of Jasper National Park
Three-thousanders of Alberta
Three-thousanders of British Columbia